Banyakang is a town in western Gambia. It is located in the Western Division.  As of 2008, it has an estimated population of 1,134.

References

Populated places in the Gambia